Cherryderry (Charadary, Carridary) was a blended fabric with silk warp and cotton weft, typically with a stripe or check pattern.

History 
Cherryderry was a 17th-century fabric. Cherryderry was a textile variety in Colonial America. Cherryderry was produced with raw materials imported from India.

Use 
Cherryderry was used for Ladies' dresses and handkerchiefs.

References 

Woven fabrics